Lotaustralin is a cyanogenic glucoside found in small amounts in Fabaceae austral trefoil (Lotus australis), cassava (Manihot esculenta), lima bean (Phaseolus lunatus), roseroot (Rhodiola rosea) and white clover (Trifolium repens), among other plants. Lotaustralin is the glucoside of methyl ethyl ketone cyanohydrin and is structurally related to linamarin, the acetone cyanohydrin glucoside also found in these plants. Both lotaustralin and linamarin may be hydrolyzed by the enzyme linamarase to form glucose and a precursor to the toxic compound hydrogen cyanide.

References 

Cyanogenic glycosides
Glucosides
Plant toxins